Rehabilitation Through The Arts (RTA) was founded by Katherine Vockins in 1996 in Sing Sing Correctional Facility in Ossining, New York, and now operates in six men's and women's, maximum and medium security New York State prisons: Sing Sing, Bedford Hills, Woodbourne, Green Haven, Fishkill and Taconic. RTA is the lead program of Prison Communities International, a 501c3 tax-exempt non-profit organization. RTA brings art workshops in theatre, music, dance, visual arts, writing and poetry behind the walls to over 230 incarcerated men and women. 

Mission Statement: RTA uses the transformative power of the arts to help people in prison develop skills to unlock their potential & succeed in the larger community.

Background 
RTA began in Sing Sing with a group of men who wanted help writing and presenting a play, and has since expanded to include dance, movement, visual arts, voice, music, literature and creative writing.
RTA's mission has evolved since 1996, when Katherine Vockins attended a graduation of the New York Theological Seminary at Sing Sing and casually asked if there was any theatre in the prison. The answer was no, but there was plenty of interest and plenty of talent. One year later, the Theatre Group presented an original piece to the prison population. The play was about their own lives - drugs, gangs, crime and bad decisions - but also about the possibility of change and redemption.

In time, participants, observing changes in their own attitudes and behavior, changed the organization's name to Rehabilitation Through The Arts.

In 2003, Sing Sing closed its medium security section. Prisoners lobbied the Department of Corrections to establish RTA at the facilities where they were transferred and programs were formed at Fishkill, Green Haven and Woodbourne Correctional Facilities.

RTA began working at Bedford Hills, New York State’s only maximum security prison for women, in 2008. The response has been beyond our expectations. From first protesting, “But I can’t draw” or “I’m so bad at this!” to tackling Shakespearean female archetypes, RTA is guiding the women of Bedford Hills in a profound process of self-discovery. In 2020, RTA began operating at Taconic Correctional Facility, a medium-security prison where many Bedford Hills residents are "stepped down" as they near release.

The mission continues to evolve, as RTA alumni seek to carry on the creative journey and maintain the community they found so meaningful inside.

Program 
RTA runs innovative workshops in theatre, dance, visual arts, music and creative writing. Men and women perform in workshop presentations and full-scale productions of both original and published works.

The arts develop the ability to communicate, collaborate, set goals and imagine alternate scenarios. Even in the harsh environment of prison, trust and community build. On release, many RTA alumni work in gang prevention, substance abuse and educational programs that help others make better choices in life.

Two research studies demonstrate the positive effects of RTA's program. John Jay College of Criminal Justice's 2003 study with the NYS Department of Correctional Services showed that RTA participants had fewer infractions than a control group. A 2010 study conducted by SUNY Purchase and the NYS Department of Correctional Services concluded that RTA participants complete the GED earlier in their incarceration, more RTA participants complete educational programs beyond the GED, and that after joining RTA, participants spent an almost three-fold increase in time enrolled in post-GED courses than those who did not participate.

RTA invites over 250 community guests, including family members of participants in some facilities, to its full-scale productions in Sing Sing Correctional Facility each year. These are extraordinary opportunities for the public to witness the intelligence, talent and humanity behind prison walls, and for families to see the effort their loved ones are making to change.

RTA's classes and productions are facilitated by 25 teaching artists who fan out to remote prisons across three state counties. These are professional artists and experienced teachers - most have advanced degrees and many teach in prestigious academic institutions.

Theatrical productions 
The following plays were produced as a part of Rehabilitation Through The Arts at Sing Sing Correctional Facility, Ossining, New York:
1776
Twelfth Night
The Wizard of Oz
Golden Boy
Our Town
A Few Good Men
Superior Donuts
Starting Over
Macbeth
Of Mice and Men
West Side Story
Stories from the Inside Out
The N_ Trial
Breakin' the Mummy's Code
Jitney
Fine Print
Twelve Angry Men
Stratford's Decision
Reality in Motion
SLAM
Voices From Within
A Few Good Men
One Flew Over the Cuckoo's Nest
The Sacrifice
An Evening of Theatre, Four Original One-Act Plays
When We're Home
Reality in Motion

Productions Outside of Sing Sing Prison:
Father Comes Home from the Wars
The Bull Pen
Two Trains Running
Jitney
Ma Rainey
The Wiz
The Odd Couple
Death of a Salesman
Same Thing Makes You Laugh, That Thing Gonna Make You Cry
Cafe of the Heart
Macbeth

Benefits and events 
RTA held its first New York City Benefit performance From Sing Sing to Broadway – An Evening Without Walls in June 2006 at Playwrights Horizons Theatre, with special guest performance by Charles Dutton.

RTA's November 2010 benefit "The Inside Story", directed by Connie Grappo, featured Broadway actors Lee Wilkof and Anne Twomey, performances by RTA alumni and an exciting auction of artwork created by RTA participants behind prison walls.

Board members 
Board members of Prison Communities International are: Karin Shiel; Allison Chernow; Katherine Vockins; Suzanne Kessler; Hans Hallundbaek; Sean Dino Johnson; Jill Becker, MD; David Schmerler; Ken Fields; Sheryl Baker; E. Annette Nash Govan; Mikki Shaw; Caroline Walcott; Lawrence Bartley and Gabe Cruz.

Funding 
RTA is funded through the Andrew W. Mellon Foundation, the Tow Foundation, Art for Justice Fund - a project of the Ford Foundation managed in partnership with Rockefeller Philanthropy Advisors - Impact100 Westchester, ArtsWestchester, Sills Family Foundation, Tikkun Olam Foundation, Stavros Niarchos Foundation, the New York State Department of Corrections & Community Supervision, the New York State Council on the Arts with the support of Governor Andrew M. Cuomo and the New York State Legislature, and many individual donors.

References

External links 
 
 http://www.beyondprison.us/chapter/taking-off-the-mask/ …
 National Institute of Corrections
 "For Inmates, a Stage Paved With Hope" by Susan Hodara, The New York Times, May 27, 2007.
 RTA Facebook page
 https://twitter.com/RTA_ARTS
 https://www.themarshallproject.org/2016/05/03/what-it-s-like-to-perform-shakespeare-in-prison
 The Impact of RTA on Social and Institutional Behavior by Lorraine Moller, Ph.D., executive summary, John Jay College of Criminal Justice
 "Program Sets the Stage for Change" by Susan Ellan, The Journal News, December 18, 2005.
 "Westchester Journal; Among the Comfortable, Prison Issues Stir Unease" by Hubert B. Herring, The New York Times, March 27, 2001.

Sing Sing
1996 establishments in New York (state)
Arts organizations established in 1996